The 2002 Vodacom Cup was the 5th edition of this annual domestic cup competition. The Vodacom Cup is played between provincial rugby union teams in South Africa from the Currie Cup Premier and First Divisions.

Competition
There were 14 teams participating in the 2002 Vodacom Cup. These teams were divided into two sections of equal strength; Section X and Section Y, both with seven teams. Teams would play all the other teams in their section once over the course of the season, either at home or away.

Teams received four points for a win and two points for a draw. Bonus points were awarded to teams that score four or more tries in a game, as well as to teams losing a match by seven points or less. Teams were ranked by points, then points difference (points scored less points conceded).

The top four teams in each section qualified for the Vodacom Top Eight competition, while the bottom three teams in Sections X and Y qualified for the Vodacom Shield competition. For both the Vodacom Top Eight and Vodacom Shield competitions, all points already scored against teams that progressed to the same competition were carried forward. Teams then played once against the teams that qualified from the other section, with the top four teams in each competition advancing to the quarter-finals.

In the quarter finals, the teams that finished first in each competition had home advantage against the teams that finished fourth and the teams that finished second in each competition had home advantage against the teams that finished third. The winners of these quarter finals then played each other in the semi-finals, with the higher placed team having home advantage. The two semi-final winners then met in the final for each competition.

The top six teams in the Vodacom Top Eight competition and the top team in the Vodacom Shield competition qualified for the 2003 Vodacom Cup, while the bottom two teams in the Vodacom Top Eight competition and remaining five teams in the Vodacom Shield competition qualified for the lesser 2003 Vodacom Shield competition.

Teams

Changes from 2001
The  withdrew from the competition.

Team Listing
The following teams took part in the 2002 Vodacom Cup competition:

Pool Phases

Tables

Section X

Section Y

Results

Section X

Round one

Round two

Round three

Round four

Round Five

Round Six

Round Seven

Section Y

Round one

Round two

Round three

Round four

Round Five

Round Six

Round Seven

Vodacom Top Eight

Table

Results

Round one

Round two

Round three

Round four

Semi-finals

Final

Winners

Vodacom Shield

Table

Results

Round one

Round two

Round three

Semi-finals

Final

Winners

References

Vodacom Cup
2002 in South African rugby union
2002 rugby union tournaments for clubs